Sa-ba-da-OW! is a jazz album by Canadian band Gypsophilia, recorded in 2008 and released in June 2009.

The album is Gypsophilia's second, and was recorded live off the floor at Echo Chamber Audio recording studio in Halifax, Nova Scotia.

Track listing
"Agricola & Sarah" (R. Burns) – 5:30 
"Sa-ba-da-OW!" (M. Myer, A. Frith, arr. M. Myer) – 3:26
"Jewish Dance Party!" (A. Fine) – 1:55
"Hietzing" (R. Burns) – 2:28
"A Oha" (S. Oore) - 3:21
"Chased" (R. Burns) - 3:33
"You Make Time" (N. Wilkinson) - 4:29
"Hietzing: The Lightning Round" (R. Burns, M. Myer) - 0:39
"Melostinato" (A. Frith) – 3:52
"Legs Bounce" (S. Oore) – 2:59
"Anything" (R. Burns) – 3:22
"Coming Soon" (A. Frith, M. Myer) – 3:22

Personnel
Nick Wilkinson – guitar, handclaps, vox
Sageev Oore – piano, Nord Stage keyboard, vox
Matt Myer – trumpet, claves, slide whistle, vox
Alec Frith – guitar, claves, vox
Adam Fine – double bass, electric bass, woodblock, handclaps, vox
Ross Burns – guitar, pandeiro, triangle, siren whistle, cabasa, vox
Gina Burgess – violin, vox

Gypsophilia albums
2009 live albums
Live jazz albums